Best of Me is a compilation album by English reggae vocalist Maxi Priest, released in 1991. The album mostly contains Priest's biggest hit singles up to 1991, including the US Billboard Hot 100 number one single, "Close to You". The majority of the tracks are from his first four studio albums: You're Safe (1985), Intentions (1986), Maxi (1987) and Bonafide (1990).

Critical reception

In a review for AllMusic, Jose F. Promis gave Best of Me four and a half out of five stars, describing the album as "timeless, breezy, and thoroughly engaging". Promis also described the album package as featuring "great pictures, song lyrics, and detailed liner notes".

Track listing

Personnel
Producers
Mikey Bennett (track 7)
Geoffrey Chung (tracks 4, 13)
Augustus "Gussie" Clarke (tracks 8, 11)
Clifton Dillon (track 7)
Sly Dunbar (tracks 1, 4, 5, 10, 13)
Nellee Hooper (track 16)
Jazzie B (track 16)
Willie Lindo (tracks 1, 5, 10)
J.P. "Bluey" Maunick (track 15)
Paul Robinson (tracks 2, 3, 9, 12)
Robbie Shakespeare (tracks 1, 5, 10)
Handel Tucker (tracks 4, 13)
Drummie Zeb (tracks 6, 14)

Other production
Executive producer: Erskine Thompson
Project co-ordination by Erskine Thompson and Sue Thompson
Compiled and edited by Crispin Murray
Mastered by Gordon Vicary at The Townhouse, London

Charts

Certifications

References

External links
Best of Me at Discogs

1991 greatest hits albums
Virgin Records compilation albums
Maxi Priest albums
Albums produced by Nellee Hooper
Albums produced by Sly and Robbie